On Memory (Greek: Περὶ μνήμης καὶ ἀναμνήσεως; Latin: De memoria et reminiscentia) is one of the short treatises that make up Aristotle's Parva Naturalia. It is frequently published together, and read together, with Aristotle's De Anima.

Editions
Richard Sorabji, Aristotle On Memory, second edition, Chicago:  University of Chicago Press, 2006,  (review)
David Bloch, Aristotle on Memory and Recollection: Text, Translation, Interpretation, and Reception in Western Scholasticism, Leiden:  Brill, 2007,  (review)

External links

On Memory and Reminiscence, translated by J. I. Beare
 
HTML Greek text: Mikros Apoplous

Works by Aristotle